Bright is a surname.  Notable people with the surname include:

A. D. Bright (1838–1898), Justice of the Tennessee Supreme Court
Adam Bright (1984-), Australian pitcher
Alfred L. Bright (1940-2019), American artist
Annie Bright (1840–1913), Australian journalist and spiritualist
Bill Bright (1921–2003), American evangelist
Bobby Bright (born 1952), U.S. congressman and mayor of Montgomery, Alabama
Charles Bright (judge) (1912-1983), Australian judge
Chris Bright (born 1970), Canadian ice hockey player
Crystal Bright (born 1981), American musician and artist
Dave Bright (born 1949), New Zealand footballer
Dora Bright (1862–1951), English composer and pianist
Graham Bright (born 1942), British Conservative politician
Greg Bright (born 1957), American football player
H. R. Bum Bright (1920-2004), American businessman and owner of the Dallas Cowboys 
Heather Bright (born 1982), American singer
Henry Bright (1810/14-1873), English artist
Henry Edward Bright (1819–1904) South Australian politician
James Franck Bright (1832–1920), English historian
Jason Bright (born 1973), Australian racing driver
Jerry Bright (born 1947), American sprinter
Jesse D. Bright (1812–1875), U.S. Senator removed from office during the American Civil War
John Bright (1811–1889), British Liberal politician
Kevin S. Bright (born 1954), American television executive producer
Kris Bright (born 1986), New Zealand footballer
Leon Bright (born 1955), American football player Tampabay and New York Giants 
Maija Bright (born 1942), more commonly known as Maija Peeples-Bright, Latvian-born American and Canadian artist 
Martin Bright (born 1966), British journalist
Mary Bright (1954–2002), Scottish curtain designer
Millie Bright (born 1993), English association football player
Mike Bright (1937-2017), American volleyball player
Myron H. Bright (1919-2016), American judge
Nick Bright, British radio DJ
Richard Bright (actor) (1937–2006), American actor
Richard Bright (physician) (1789–1858), English physician and kidney disease research pioneer
Rick Bright, American immunologist and whistleblower
Robert Bright (1902–1988), American author and illustrator of children's literature
Ronnie Bright (1938-2015), American singer
Rowena Bright (born 1980), Australian alpine skier
Simon Bright, art and set decorator, The Lord of the Rings (film series)
Stephen Bright (born 1948), American lawyer
Susie Bright (born 1958), sexuality writer
Tarryn Bright (born 1983), South African field hockey player
Terry Bright (born 1958), Australian footballer
Thomas Lockyer Bright (1818–1874), Australian journalist
Torah Bright (born 1986), Australian snowboarder
William Bright (1928–2006), linguist
William Leatham Bright (1851-1910), English politician

See also
 Bright (given name)

English-language surnames